Brigadier Robert Neville Atkinson, FAMA (born 21 March 1947) is an Australian orthopaedic surgeon and retired senior officer of the Royal Australian Army Medical Corps, best known for his contributions to trauma and military surgery.

Career
Atkinson graduated with a Bachelor of Medicine, Bachelor of Surgery from the University of Adelaide in 1970, completed his residency, then served with the Australian Army as a medical officer during the Vietnam War, specialising in trauma and orthopaedic surgery. He continued his career in the Australian Army Reserve, becoming Assistant Surgeon General (Army) of the Australian Defence Force (ADF). In 1998, he was promoted to brigadier. He was also Emeritus Consultant in Military Surgery for the ADF.

His military service included deployment to the Gulf War, and peacekeeping missions in Rwanda, Bougainville and East Timor. He also served in Aceh, and Samoa, following the tsunamis of 2005 and 2009.

Atkinson has served on the council of the Royal Australasian College of Surgeons, and received the E.S.R. Hughes Award for distinguished contributions to military surgery.

In 2008 Atkinson was appointed a Member of the Order of Australia (AM) "for services to medicine as an orthopaedic surgeon and through contributions to professional associations", and was admitted as a Fellow of the Australian Medical Association (FAMA) in the same year.

In 2014, Atkinson became the President of the Naval, Military and Air Force Club of South Australia. In the same year he unsuccessfully ran for a seat in the South Australian Legislative Council on the independent 'Your Voice Matters' ticket.

Publications
Atkinson has contributed to published papers on medical, surgical and road safety since 1978, including:

See also
Candidates of the South Australian state election, 2014

Footnotes

References

External links
 SALife7 Interview with Rob Atkinson – Simpson and his Donkey – unveiled!

1947 births
Australian brigadiers
Australian military personnel of the Gulf War
Australian military personnel of the International Force for East Timor
Australian military personnel of the Vietnam War
Australian orthopaedic surgeons
Fellows of the Australian Medical Association
Living people
Members of the Order of Australia
20th-century surgeons